Lynne Viola is a scholar on the Soviet Union. She is a professor at the University of Toronto and has written four books and 30 articles.

Early life
Raised in Nutley, New Jersey, she graduated from Nutley High School in 1973.

Viola graduated from Barnard College in 1978 and received a Ph.D. from Princeton University in 1984.

Awards and honours
In 2014, she was inducted into the Royal Society of Canada. In 2018, she was the recipient of the Thomas Henry Pentland Molson Prize. In 2019, she was awarded a Killam Prize.

Publications
 1987, The best sons of the fatherland: Workers in the vanguard of Soviet collectivization
 1996, Peasant rebels under Stalin: Collectivization and the culture of peasant resistance
 2002, Contending with Stalinism: Soviet power and popular resistance in the 1930s
 2007, The unknown gulag: The lost world of Stalin's special settlements
 2008, The war against the peasantry, 1927–1930: the tragedy of the Soviet countryside
 2017, Stalinist perpetrators on trial: Scenes from the Great Terror in Soviet Ukraine

References

1958 births
Living people
Canadian women non-fiction writers
Barnard College alumni
Fellows of the Royal Society of Canada
Nutley High School alumni
People from Nutley, New Jersey
Princeton University alumni
Academic staff of the University of Toronto
Canadian women historians
20th-century Canadian non-fiction writers
20th-century Canadian women writers
21st-century Canadian non-fiction writers
21st-century Canadian women writers
Historians of Russia
Historians of communism
Historians of the Soviet Union